Dong He (died early 221), courtesy name Youzai, was an official and minister of the state of Shu Han during the Three Kingdoms period of China. He originally served as Administrator of Yizhou under Liu Zhang, but surrendered to Liu Bei during Liu Bei's takeover of Yi Province. Dong He became a military supervisor, along with Zhuge Liang and was one of Liu Bei most important civil officers. He stayed in office until his death seven years later. Although it previously costed him his position under Liu Zhang, Dong He would not renounce his fair treatment, just rule and plain living. For those qualities, Dong He was admired and trusted by Han civilians and foreigners alike. His son, Dong Yun would inherit most of his characteristics and become one of the four heroic chancellors.

Early life
Dong He's ancestors originally hailed from Jiangzhou in Ba commandery. However by the time Dong He was born, they left for Nan in Jing Province. During the End of the Han dynasty, in 196, Dong He led his family back west in the Yi Province. Having heard of his arrival, Liu Zhang named him Chief of the counties Niubi (牛鞞) and Jiangyuan (江原). Dong He was soon promoted to prefect of Chengdu (成都令) making one of Liu Zhang most prominent civil advisers.

Service under Liu Zhang
During this time, the Yi province was rich and fruitful. Soon the local customs became extravagant and wasteful. Those who did well dressed in the same clothes as marquises and ate with jade utensils. The marriage ceremonies and funeral processions were a waste of the common resources and were so extravagant that they could ruin an entire family. However, while Dong He was in an important position, he made sure to respect the laws and lived as an example for others. Dong He would be wearing simple clothing and was known to be a vegetarian, in all manners he would guard himself against excess and would live a temperament and humble life. He would end the instituted regulations and improve the current customs. Awed by him, the magnates of the prefecture would not dare to break the laws.

This strict application of the laws didn't go well with the powerful and influential families of the region therefore they convinced Liu Zhang to have Dong He transferred far away as chief commandant of the Badong dependent state. When the people of Chengdu learned that Dong He would be leaving, they were distraught. And several thousands would personally beg to have Dong He stay, among them were local officials but also civilians, young and old, the elderly and the frail all assent their will to see Dong He stay.

Thanks to their perseveration, Liu Zhang listened to them and allowed Dong He to stay for two years before he was appointed as the Administrator of Yizhou (益州太守), again a far away and still unruly land. Yet Dong He did not change his ways. His integrity and restraint remained the same. He resolved the common affairs with a sincere heart and would seek to work with the non-Chineses people and tried to promote rightful attitude. Hence the people, whether they were Yi citizens or Man foreigners came to love and trust him for his equal treatment of the civilians and respected him for his frugal way of life.

Chang Qu in the Huayang Guo Zhi stated that Yizhou (later renamed as Jinning (晉寧)) as a Commandery (郡) disposed of many natural assets. Among them were parrots, peacocks, salt ponds, agricultural fields, fishing rivers, livestock along with gold and silver. Making the region bountiful from common to expensive resources however it was also difficult to maintain control over the territory because of the rebellious locals. He praised Dong He for being one of the few officials who could restrain the locals and therefore benefit from the abundant riches of the land.

Service under Liu Bei
In 214, after Liu Bei's takeover of Yi Province. Liu Bei heard good things about Dong He and summoned him as a General of the Gentlemen-of-the-Household Manager of the army (掌軍中郎將), along with Zhuge Liang. Making him the one in charge of the affairs of the government and Liu Bei's office. Dong He previously demonstrated his talent as an administrator and quickly adapted to his new position. Zhuge Liang and Dong He were of the same mind and quickly came to be good friends. Both of them managed the most important matters of the state. They would initiate, discuss, and follow good propositions yet they had the right to stop others if they seem unfeasible, under their joint administration the state's affairs came to prosper. Since Dong He opened his office and started receiving a salary, he has been in charge of difficult regions, had to oversee important matters and managed high positions for more than twenty years yet the day he died, his family didn't have any personal wealth.

Zhuge Liang's appreciation of Dong He and others
After Dong He's death, Zhuge Liang became Chancellor and told his various officers and subordinates: 

Another time, Zhuge Liang also said: Zhuge Liang always spoke highly of Dong He and had fond memories of him after his death.

Appraisal
Chen Shou, who wrote Dong He's biography in the Records of the Three Kingdoms (Sanguozhi), appraised Dong He as follows: "Dong He was a wise and honorable official. He pursued the purity of “The Sacrificial Lamb”... Along with Liu Ba, Ma Liang, Chen Zhen and Dong Yun, he was one of the best officials in Shu."

Sima Guang in the Zizhi Tongjian mentioned that Dong He was honest, frugal, fair and upright. Therefore, he was even trusted and loved by the foreign tribes.

See also
 Lists of people of the Three Kingdoms

Notes

References 

 Chen, Shou (3rd century). Records of the Three Kingdoms (Sanguozhi).
 Chang Qu (4th century). Chronicles of Huayang (Huayang Guo Zhi).
 Pei, Songzhi (5th century). Annotations to Records of the Three Kingdoms (Sanguozhi zhu).

Shu Han politicians
221 deaths
Year of birth unknown
Officials under Liu Bei
Liu Zhang and associates